Achacha is a district situated within Mostaganem Province, lying on the Mediterranean Sea, northern Algeria. The district was named after its capital, Achacha.

Municipalities
The district is further divided into four municipalities, these include the following:
Achacha (population: 31,360) 
Khadra (population: 12,294 
Nekmaria (population: 9,104) 
Ouled Boughalem (population: 11,886)

References

Districts of Mostaganem Province